Roystonea princeps, commonly known as Morass cabbage palm or Morass royal palm, is a species of palm which is endemic to western Jamaica.

Description
Individuals have about 15 leaves with  rachises. The  inflorescences bear creamy yellow male and female flowers; the anthers of the male flowers are purplish.

Taxonomy
For most of the 19th century, only two species of royal palms were generally recognised: Greater Antillean royal palms were considered Oreodoxa regia (now Roystonea regia), while Lesser Antillean ones were considered O. oleracea (R. oleracea).  Several new species were recognised early in the 20th century, among them a Jamaican species that was named Oreodoxa princeps by Italian botanist Odoardo Beccari in 1912.  Due to problems with the way that the genus Oreodoxa had been applied by taxonomists, American botanist Orator F. Cook had proposed that the name Roystonea (in honour of American general Roy Stone) be applied to the royal palms.  In 1929 German botanist Max Burret transferred O. princeps to the genus Roystonea.

Common names
Roystonea princeps is known as the "Morass cabbage palm", "Morass royal palm" "swamp cabbage" or simply "royal palm".

Reproduction and growth

Distribution
Roystonea princeps is endemic to the western Jamaican parishes of St. Elizabeth and Westmoreland, in wetlands around Black River and Negril.

References

princeps
Endemic flora of Jamaica
Trees of Jamaica
Least concern flora of North America
Plants described in 1912
Taxa named by Odoardo Beccari